Francesco D'Adda (born 15 October 1943) is an Italian actor. He appeared in more than seventy films since 1970.

Selected filmography

References

External links 

1943 births
Living people
Italian male film actors